Mark Edwards (born 15 September 1963) is a retired British boxer.

Boxing career
He competed in the men's middleweight event at the 1992 Summer Olympics.

He represented England and won a bronze medal in the -75 kg middleweight division, at the 1990 Commonwealth Games in Auckland, New Zealand.

Boxing for the Royal Navy, he was twice winner of the prestigious ABA middleweight championship (1988 and 1991).

References

External links
 

1963 births
Living people
British male boxers
Olympic boxers of Great Britain
Boxers at the 1992 Summer Olympics
Boxers from Greater London
Commonwealth Games medallists in boxing
Boxers at the 1990 Commonwealth Games
Commonwealth Games bronze medallists for England
Middleweight boxers
Medallists at the 1990 Commonwealth Games